José Antonio Aguiriano Forniés (9 August 1932 – 14 May 1996) was a Spanish socialist politician who served during the first and constituent legislatures of the Congress of Deputies, representing Álava. He also was a member of the Basque Parliament between 1980 and 1981.

Honours 
  Gold Medal of Merit in Labour (20 June 1984)
 Order of Civil Merit, Grand Cross, 17 May 1996 (posthumous)

References

1932 births
1996 deaths
Members of the 1st Basque Parliament
Members of the constituent Congress of Deputies (Spain)
Members of the 1st Congress of Deputies (Spain)
People from Vitoria-Gasteiz
Spanish Socialist Workers' Party politicians
University of Zaragoza alumni
Grand Cross of the Order of Civil Merit